Sarah Jennifer Bryce (born 8 January 2000) is a Scottish cricketer who plays for the Scotland women's cricket team. Her sister, Kathryn, has also played international cricket for Scotland. In 2019, she played domestic cricket in England for Nottinghamshire, before signing for Kent in 2020. She also plays for the regional team The Blaze.

Career
Bryce played for the Scotland women's national cricket team in the 2017 Women's Cricket World Cup Qualifier in February 2017.

In June 2018, she was named in Scotland's squad for the 2018 ICC Women's World Twenty20 Qualifier tournament. She made her Women's Twenty20 International (WT20I) for Scotland against Uganda in the World Twenty20 Qualifier on 7 July 2018. She was the leading run-scorer for Scotland in the tournament, with 162 runs in five matches. Following the conclusion of the tournament, she was named as the rising star of Scotland's squad by the International Cricket Council (ICC). In July 2018, she was named in the ICC Women's Global Development Squad.

In May 2019, she was named in Scotland's squad for the 2019 ICC Women's Qualifier Europe tournament in Spain. In August 2019, she was named as the captain of Scotland's squad for the 2019 Netherlands Women's Quadrangular Series.

In August 2019, she was named in Scotland's squad for the 2019 ICC Women's World Twenty20 Qualifier tournament in Scotland. In October 2019, she was named in the Women's Global Development Squad, ahead of a five-match series in Australia.

In November 2020, Bryce was nominated for the ICC Women's Associate Cricketer of the Decade award. In 2021, she was drafted by Oval Invincibles for the inaugural season of The Hundred.

In January 2022, she was named in Scotland's team for the 2022 Commonwealth Games Cricket Qualifier tournament in Malaysia. In April 2022, she was signed by the Welsh Fire for the 2022 season of The Hundred in England.

References

External links
 
 

2000 births
Living people
Scottish women cricketers
Scotland women Twenty20 International cricketers
Nottinghamshire women cricketers
Kent women cricketers
The Blaze women's cricketers
Cricketers from Edinburgh
Oval Invincibles cricketers
Welsh Fire cricketers